Pomatoschistus marmoratus, the marbled goby, is a species of goby native to the eastern Atlantic from the Bay of Biscay down around the Iberian Peninsula through the Mediterranean Sea, the Black Sea and the Sea of Azov. It is also found in the Suez Canal in Egypt. It can reach a length of  TL though most do not exceed  TL.

References

marbled goby
Fish of the Mediterranean Sea
Fish of the Black Sea
Fish of the Sea of Azov
marbled goby
Taxa named by Antoine Risso